The Conference on Computer Vision and Pattern Recognition (CVPR) is an annual conference on computer vision and pattern recognition, which is regarded as one of the most important conferences in its field. According to Google Scholar Metrics (2022), it is the highest impact computing venue.

Affiliations
CVPR was first held in Washington DC in 1983 by Takeo Kanade and Dana Ballard (previously the conference was named Pattern Recognition and Image Processing). From 1985 to 2010 it was sponsored by the IEEE Computer Society. In 2011 it was also co-sponsored by University of Colorado Colorado Springs. Since 2012 it has been co-sponsored by the IEEE Computer Society and the Computer Vision Foundation, which provides open access to the conference papers.

Scope
CVPR considers a wide range of topics related to computer vision and pattern recognition—basically any topic that is extracting structures or answers from images or video or applying mathematical methods to data to extract or recognize patterns. Common topics include object recognition, image segmentation, motion estimation, 3D reconstruction, and deep learning.

The conference is highly selective with generally <30% acceptance rates for all papers and <5% for oral presentations. It is managed by a rotating group of volunteers who are chosen in a public election at the Pattern Analysis and Machine Intelligence-Technical Community (PAMI-TC) meeting four years before the meeting. CVPR uses a multi-tier double-blind peer review process. The program chairs (who cannot submit papers), select area chairs who manage the reviewers for their subset of submissions.

Location
The conference is usually held in June in North America.

Awards

CVPR Best Paper Award
These awards are picked by committees delegated by the program chairs of the conference.

Longuet-Higgins Prize
The Longuet-Higgins Prize recognizes CVPR papers from ten years ago that have made a significant impact on computer vision research.

PAMI Young Researcher Award
The Pattern Analysis and Machine Intelligence (PAMI) Young Researcher Award is an award given by the Technical Committee on Pattern Analysis and Machine Intelligence (TCPAMI) of the IEEE Computer Society to a researcher within 7 years of completing their Ph.D. for outstanding early career research contributions. Candidates are nominated by the computer vision community, with winners selected by a committee of senior researchers in the field. This award was originally instituted in 2012 by the journal Image and Vision Computing, also presented at the CVPR, and the IVC continues to sponsor the award.

PAMI Thomas S. Huang Memorial Prize
The Thomas Huang Memorial Prize was established at CVPR 2020 and is awarded annually starting from CVPR 2021 to honor researchers who are recognized as examples in research, teaching/mentoring, and service to the computer vision community.

Acceptance Rates

See also
 International Conference on Computer Vision
 European Conference on Computer Vision

References

External links 
2020 conference website
2019 conference website

Computer vision research infrastructure
IEEE conferences
Signal processing conferences
Computer science conferences